María Rebecca Latigo de Hernández (July 29, 1896 – January 8, 1986) was a Mexican-American rights activist. She was born in San Pedro Garza García, Mexico. During the 1930s, she spoke publicly and demonstrated on behalf of Mexican Americans about their education in the United States. She and her husband, Pedro Hernandez Barrera, founded Orden Caballeros de America on January 10, 1929. She organized the Asociación Protectora de Madres in 1933. In 1970 she was active in the Raza Unida Party.

Personal life 
Hernández was married in 1915 at the age of 19 to Pedro Hernández Barrera. They were married in Hebbronville, Texas. They moved to San Antonio, in 1918, where they settled down, and their family eventually grew to include 10 children.

She died of pneumonia on January 8, 1986. She is buried in the plot of the Orden Caballeros de América outside of Elmendorf, Texas.

References

External links
 

1896 births
1986 deaths
Activists from Texas
People from San Pedro Garza García, Nuevo León
People from San Antonio
Mexican emigrants to the United States
Deaths from pneumonia in Texas
People with acquired American citizenship
20th-century American women
20th-century Mexican women
Mexican activists
Mexican women activists
League of United Latin American Citizens activists
Women civil rights activists